Edna Gisel Díaz Acevedo (born 24 April 1985) is a Mexican taekwondo practitioner, psychologist and politician. 

She won a gold medal in lightweight at the 2005 World Taekwondo Championships in Madrid, after defeating Su Li-wen in the final. She won a bronze medal at the 2010 Pan American Taekwondo Championships.

Díaz studied at Universidad del Valle de México and finished with a degree in psychology and a Master's degree in sport management.

She has been active in politics since 2015. In the 2018 federal elections in Mexico, she was elected as a candidate for federal deputation for District IX in Uruapan with the Por México al Frente alliance. For 2021, the PRI, PAN and PRD named her a candidate for representation for the IX district of Uruapan with the Va por México alliance. She was re-elected and is president of the Commission for Climate Change and Sustainability.

References

External links

1985 births
Living people
Mexican female taekwondo practitioners
World Taekwondo Championships medalists
Pan American Taekwondo Championships medalists
20th-century Mexican women
21st-century Mexican women